Calobatella is a genus of flies belonging to the family Micropezidae.

The species of this genus are found in Europe.

Species:

Calobatella longiceps 
Calobatella mammillata 
Calobatella nigrolamellata 
Calobatella petronella 
Calobatella rufithorax 
Calobatella uchidana

References

Micropezidae